Rešad Bešlagić (1912–1945) was a Bosnian folk singer and sevdalinka interpreter.

Biography
Bešlagić was born in Tuzla, Bosnia and Herzegovina shortly before World War I broke out in nearby Sarajevo in 1914.

He was killed during World War II by fascist Ustaše troops in Sarajevo, aged 33. Despite this, during the time of communist Yugoslavia he was mistakenly put on the list of the Jasenovac concentration camp victims.

References

1912 births
1945 deaths
Musicians from Tuzla
People from the Condominium of Bosnia and Herzegovina
Bosniaks of Bosnia and Herzegovina
Sevdalinka
People executed by the Independent State of Croatia
Bosnia and Herzegovina civilians killed in World War II
20th-century Bosnia and Herzegovina male singers